Andreas Anastasiou (born June 13, 1995 in Larnaca) is a Cypriot football forward who currently plays for Digenis Oroklinis. He started his career at P.O. Xylotymbou when in 2011 took a transfer to Cypriot First Division club, Alki Larnaca.

Honors

Individual
 Cypriot Third Division Top goalscorer: 2016–17 (22 Goals)

External links
 Anastasiou at Alki Larnaca.
 Anastasiou at ASIL Lysi.
 Anastasiou at P.O. Xylotymbou.
 Anastasiou at Digenis.
 

Living people
1995 births
Cypriot footballers
Alki Larnaca FC players
ASIL Lysi players
P.O. Xylotymbou players
Digenis Oroklinis players
Cypriot First Division players
People from Larnaca

Association football forwards